Alexandru Aposteanu (born 9 August 1942) is a Romanian rower. He competed in the men's double sculls event at the 1968 Summer Olympics.

References

External links
 

1942 births
Living people
Romanian male rowers
Olympic rowers of Romania
Rowers at the 1968 Summer Olympics
Sportspeople from Târgu Jiu